The Border Championships  was a men's and women's international tennis tournament established in 1902 as the Border State Championships and was played on outdoor hard courts at the Selborne Park Tennis Club, East London, Eastern Cape Province, South Africa until 1981.

History
The Border Championships were established in 1902 and was organised by the Border Tennis Union. The championships were part of the Sugar Circuit (f. 1962) of tennis tournaments from the 1960s to 1980s. In 1980 the tournament was ended due to the withdraw of sponsorship by South African Sugar Association.

Venues
The championships were staged at the Selborne Park Tennis Club East London, Eastern Cape Province, South Africa.

References

Defunct tennis tournaments in South Africa